A prizefighter is someone who competes in a contest between fighters for a prize, a sum of money, etc.; for example a professional boxer or mixed martial artist.

Prizefighter or Prize Fighter may also refer to:

Video games and boxing
 Don King Presents: Prizefighter, a 2008 video game by 2k Sports
 Prize Fighter (video game), a 1993 video game by Digital Pictures
 Prizefighter series, a knockout boxing tournament

Music
 PrizeFighter: Hit After Hit, a 2014 album by Trisha Yearwood
 "PrizeFighter" (song), a song from the album featuring Kelly Clarkson
 "Prizefighter", a 1980 single by British band Jigsaw
 "Prize Fighter", a song by The Killers from the deluxe edition of Battle Born
 "Prizefighter", a song by Eels from Hombre Lobo and Wonderful, Glorious
 "Prizefighter", a song by Bush from the album The Science of Things (1999)

Film
 The Prize Fighter, a 1979 American comedy film